Shawn K. Wong is a Chinese American author and scholar. He has served as the Professor of English, Director of the University Honors Program (2003–06), Chair of the Department of English (1997–2002), and Director of the Creative Writing Program (1995–97) at the University of Washington, where he has been on the faculty since 1984 and teaches courses covering critical theory, Asian American studies, which he is considered a pioneer in, and fiction writing. Wong received his undergraduate degree in English at the University of California Berkeley (1971) and a master's degree in Creative Writing at San Francisco State University (1974).

Writings 

Wong's first novel, Homebase, published by Reed and Cannon (1979), won the Pacific Northwest Booksellers Association Award and the 15th Annual Governor's Writers Day Award of Washington. His second novel, American Knees, first published by Simon & Schuster in 1996, was adapted into an independent feature film entitled Americanese (2010), written and directed by Eric Byler and produced by Lisa Onodera. The book was re-issued in 2005 by University of Washington Press.

Wong explained in an interview the title "American Knees": "When I was a child, kids used to come up to me and ask, 'What are you: Chinese, Japanese or Americanese?", while some asked if I was "Chinese, Japanese or dirty knees?"

"I never really knew what that meant when I was a kid," Wong says, "but I knew I didn't like it."

Wong is also co-editor of six multicultural literary anthologies including the pioneering anthology Aiiieeeee! An Anthology of Asian-American Writers (reprinted in four different editions), Literary Mosaic: Asian American and Asian Diasporas, Cultures, Identities, Representations, and The Big Aiiieeeee! He is co-editor of Before Columbus Foundation Fiction/Poetry Anthology: Selections from the American Book Awards, 1980-1990 – two volumes of contemporary American multicultural poetry and fiction.

Wong has been awarded a National Endowment for the Arts Creative Writing Fellowship and a Rockefeller Foundation residency in Italy. He was featured in the 1997 PBS documentary Shattering the Silences, and in the Bill Moyers' PBS documentary Becoming American: The Chinese Experience, in 2003. He is also featured in the 2005 documentary What's Wrong With Frank Chin?

Wong also serves as consulting and contributing editor for Transtext(e)s-Transcultures: A Journal of Global Cultural Studies.

Career

Shawn Wong specializes in Creative Writing and Asian American studies. Since 1972, he has taught at several colleges and universities, including Mills College, University of California at Santa Cruz, San Francisco State University, and the University of Washington. He has also taught at the University of Tübingen (Germany), Jean Moulin University (Lyon), and at the University of Washington Rome Center (Italy).

He is on the faculty of the Red Badge Project, which teaches storytelling to veterans suffering from PTSD, depression, or anxiety disorders.

Bibliography

Author
American Knees (novel), Simon & Schuster, 1995; Scribner paperback, 1996; re-issued by University of Washington Press, 2005
Homebase (novel), Reed & Cannon, 1979; re-issued by Plume/NAL, 1990; re-issued by University of Washington Press, 2008

Editor
Asian Diasporas: Cultures, Identities, Representations (with Robbie Goh), Hong Kong University Press, 2004
The Literary Mosaic: An Anthology of Asian American Literature, Harper Collins, 1995
The Before Columbus Foundation Fiction Anthology: Selections from the American Book Awards 1980-1990 (with Ishmael Reed and Kathryn Trueblood), W.W. Norton Co., 1992
The Before Columbus Foundation Poetry Anthology: Selections from the American Book Awards 1980-1990 (with J. J. Phillips, Ishmael Reed, Gundars Strads), W.W. Norton Co., 1992
The Big Aiiieeeee! An Anthology of Chinese American and Japanese American Literature (with Jeffery Paul Chan, Frank Chin, and Lawson Fusao Inada), Meridian/NAL, 1991
Yardbird Reader Volume 3 (with Frank Chin), Yardbird Publishing Inc., 1974 
Aiiieeeee! An Anthology of Asian American Writers (with Frank Chin, Jeffery Paul Chan, Lawson Fusao Inada), Howard University Press, 1974; most recent re-issue by Meridian, 1997

See also 

Chinese American literature
List of Asian American writers

References

External links
Shawn Wong profile on University of Washington website
Shawn Wong discusses "American Knees" becoming a movie, at Rainbow Bookfest (minority authors) in Northwest Asian Weekly
 with Shawn Wong by Stephen McKiernan, Binghamton University Libraries Center for the Study of the 1960s, August 23, 2010

1949 births
American writers of Chinese descent
Writers from Oakland, California
Writers from Seattle
Living people
American academics of English literature
American academics of Chinese descent
San Francisco State University alumni
UC Berkeley College of Letters and Science alumni
University of Washington faculty
American novelists of Chinese descent
American male novelists
Novelists from Washington (state)
American male non-fiction writers